William S. Johnson may refer to:

William Samuel Johnson (1727–1819), United States founding father and Senator for Connecticut
William Summer Johnson (1913–1995), American chemist and steroid researcher

See also
 William Johnson (disambiguation)